Arafat Minhas (born 2 January 2005 in Multan, Punjab) is a Pakistani cricketer who plays for Southern Punjab and Multan Sultans.

Early life 
Minhas was born in Multan, Punjab, into a Muslim Rajput family of the Minhas clan to Kashif Minhas, a former Under-19 cricketer. Minhas considers his father to be his role model and also admired AB de Villiers. He began to play red-ball club-level cricket at the age of 9 and went on to play Under-13 and Under-16 cricket. In Under-19 cricket he was adjudged player of the tournament in the National Under-19 Championship 2021/22.

Domestic career 
Minhas captained Gwadar Sharks in the 2022 Pakistan Junior League and was named in the team of the tournament as captain. Minhas made his List A debut for Southern Punjab against Sindh on 10 December 2022 during the 2022–23 Pakistan Cup. Minhas was selected by Multan Sultans in the supplementary category during the 2023 Pakistan Super League players draft.

International career 
Minhas has played for the Pakistan under-19 team. In December 2022, Minhas was added to the Pakistani Test squad along with Mohammad Zeeshan and Basit Ali by the interim selection committee.

References

External links 
 
 Arafat Minhas at Pakistan Cricket Board

2005 births
Living people
Multan Sultans cricketers
Pakistani cricketers
Southern Punjab (Pakistan) cricketers
Cricketers from Multan